Robert Fair may refer to:

 Robert Fair (Canadian politician) (1891–1954), Canadian farmer and politician
 Robert James Fair (1919–2002), American politician from Indiana
 Robert Leahy Fair (1923–1983), U.S. Army general